John Norton is an American poet and fiction writer.

Life
John Norton graduated from Boston College and the University of Pennsylvania with an M.A. and Ph.D.  He taught at the University of California, Riverside.
John moved to San Francisco in the 1970s and soon afterward joined Robert Gluck's Writing Workshop at Small Press Traffic.  His poems and stories began to appear in a variety of small magazines and literary journals, including America, New American Writing, CrossConnect, Kayak, Oxygen, Beatitude, Blue Unicorn, Onthebus, and Processed World.

John served as Board President of Small Press Traffic Literary Arts Center and the Irish Arts Foundation.  He helped organize the Crossroads Irish American Festival.

He read from his work in San Francisco, Berkeley, Los Angeles, Boston, New York, Philadelphia, Riverside, Rochester, and Toulouse, France.

John lived in San Francisco, and worked in Silicon Valley as a technical writer and editor.
John was married to artist Anne Subercaseaux in San Francisco, previously partners for 17 years. He was born on July 4, 1936 in Boston and died on August 9, 2015 in San Francisco.

Awards
 American Book Award

Works
 Air Transmigra (San Francisco: Ithuriel's Spear)  August 2010.  
 Re:Marriage (San Francisco: Black Star Series) 2000. 
 The Light at the End of the Bog, (San Francisco: Black Star Series) 1989, 1992 
 Posthum(or)ous (San Francisco: e. g. press) 1985 (chapbook)

Anthologies
 Beatitude 1959-2009 Golden Anniversary Anthology, (America's Press, 2010) 
 The Before Columbus Poetry Anthology: Selections from the American Book Awards 1980-1990, (W.W. Norton & Company, 1991)

References

American male poets
University of Pennsylvania alumni
Living people
American Book Award winners
Year of birth missing (living people)